Ödön is a male given name of Hungarian origin, since the 19th century Ödön became variant of Edmund. It may refer to:

 Ödön Bárdi (1877–1958), actor
 Ödön Batthyány-Strattmann (1826–1914) nobleman
 Ödön Beöthy (1796–1854), politician
 Ödön Bodor (1882–1927), athlete
 Ödön Földessy (1929–2020), long jumper
 Ödön von Horváth (1901–1938), writer
 Ödön Lechner (1845–1914), architect
 Ödön Mihalovich (1842–1929), composer and music educator
 Ödön Pártos (1907–1977), musician and composer
 Ödön Singer (1831–1912), violinist

See also
Odon (disambiguation)

Hungarian masculine given names